Soronia grisea is a species of sap-feeding beetle in the family Nitidulidae. It is found in Europe and Northern Asia (excluding China), North America, and Southern Asia.

References

Further reading

 
 

Nitidulidae
Articles created by Qbugbot
Beetles described in 1758
Taxa named by Carl Linnaeus